India Ahead is a nationwide English News Channel. It is promoted by Andhra Prabha Media Group and was launched in June of 2018. The Channel carries news, current affairs, entertainment, sports, and business programming from an Indian, as well as an International Perspective. It is the first English news channel to be beamed out of South India.

History 
Andhra Prabha entered into the space of broadcasting with an Indian television channel dedicated to English News channel.  The channel headquarter is situated in Hyderabad, India, with studios in Delhi and Hyderabad.

India Ahead was led by Chetan Sharma as Founding CEO and Editorial Director. In June, 2020 Andhra Prabha Group’s MD Mootha Goutam  announced senior management changes to the English new channel India Ahead. While the founding CEO Chetan Sharma has moved on, the channel has made a series of senior appointments. Former CNN-News18 Sudeep Mukhia has joined India Ahead as Group President, News Room Operations & Editorial Strategies. Bhupendra Chaubey is the editor in chief. Sudha Sadanand is the Editorial President

Viewership ratings 
The channel became the No. 1 channel in terms of average time spent by viewers during the Budget Week among all the English News Channels of India.  Also, the channel is performing well in the Southern Indian States such as Andhra Pradesh, Telangana, Tamil Nadu and Karnataka.

Distribution Network 
India Ahead is available on all major D2H platforms and cable television operators as a Free-to-Air channel. Also, the channel is available through its mobile app on the Google Play store and iStore. The channel uses its social media platforms for distributing the news.

See also 

 Media in India
 List of news channels in India
 Andhra Prabha

References 
https://www.exchange4media.com/announcements-news/bhupendra-chaubey-joins-india-ahead-as-owner-co-promoter-106273.html

24-hour television news channels in India